The Elon Phoenix baseball team is the interscholastic baseball team from Elon University in Elon, North Carolina. They are part of the NCAA Division I Colonial Athletic Association. The team is led by head coach Mike Kennedy, who has been head coach since 1997.

Elon currently plays its home games at Walter C. Latham Park on Elon's campus. (Calvert, 2009)

History

1997-present
Mike Kennedy has been the head coach at Elon since 1997. He was a Two Time Honorable Mention All American Catcher for Elon University 1988–1990, and was later selected in the 9th round of the 1990 Amateur Draft. He spent four seasons as Elon's Pitching coach before becoming head coach. Kennedy was selected to serve as the pitching coach for the USA Baseball's National Team (Collegiate) during the summer. Prior to the 2010 season Kennedy led Elon to 436 victories in his 13 years, and has led the team to 19 victories over teams ranked in the top 25 in the past 11 years (Calvert, 2009). During the 2010 season, Kennedy led the Phoenix to back-to-back road wins against highly ranked Clemson University as well as a home win against University of North Carolina at Chapel Hill and wins against Wake Forest and N.C. State. The 2010 team made it past the Socon Tournament and into the NCAA Regional rounds. On April 24, 2011, Kennedy won his 500th game at Elon as the Phoenix defeated Georgia Southern by a final of 9–0.

Kennedy's program has won 40 or more games in three of the last seven seasons and boasts four Southern Conference regular-season crowns.

With each victory tallied, Kennedy adds to his record for the most wins by an Elon baseball coach that he set in 2003.  In his 16 seasons, Kennedy has guided the Phoenix to 543 victories. In the last 14 seasons, Elon has had 22 victories over opponents ranked in the top-25.  In his tenure, Kennedy has led his program to 49 victories over Atlantic Coast Conference opponents.

In 2012, Kennedy led his Phoenix squad to yet another top-three finish in the SoCon as the maroon and gold went 33–26 overall and 20–10 in league action. Kennedy's teams have now posted at least 30 victories in each of their 13 official NCAA Division I seasons.

At the conclusion of the season, two Elon players were selected in the Major League Baseball First-Year Player Draft. Two Phoenix standouts were also recognized with All-Southern Conference accolades.

During the 2011 season, Kennedy collected his 500th career victory as his Phoenix shutout league rival Georgia Southern 9–0 on April 24. The squad won the program's fourth Southern Conference regular-season crown by churning out 23 league victories. Overall, the team posted a 36–21 record.

Following the year, four Elon players were selected in the Major League Baseball First-Year Player Draft and a fifth signed a free agent contract. Four members of the squad were also recognized with all-league accolades, including John Brebbia who was chosen as the SoCon Pitcher of the Year.  Infielder Sebastian Gomez was honored as a member of the Louisville Slugger Freshmen All-American Team.

Top Major League Baseball Draft picks in Elon's history

2019 – George Kirby
(Round 1, 20th overall by the Seattle Mariners)

1971 – Gary Brown 
(Round 1, 21st overall by the Chicago Cubs)

1981 – Joey Hackett 
(Round 4, 71st overall by the Texas Rangers)

2008 – Steven Hensley
(Round 4, 132nd overall by the Seattle Mariners)

2001 – Brad Pinkerton 
(Round 5, 149th overall by the Anaheim Angels)

2009 – Chase Austin
(Round 5, 158th overall by the Florida Marlins)

2001 – Scott Light 
(Round 6, 186th overall by the Cincinnati Reds)

2010 – Jimmy Reyes
(Round 7, 226th overall by the Texas Rangers)

1966 – Dick Such 
(Round 8, 100th overall by the Washington Senators)

1992 – Aaron Cannaday 
(Round 8, 231st overall by the Pittsburgh Pirates)

2019 – Kyle Brnovich
(Round 8, 241st overall by the Los Angeles Angels)

2019 – Ty Adcock
(Round 8, 246th overall by the Seattle Mariners)

1990 – Mike Kennedy 
(Round 9, 255th overall by the Oakland Athletics)

Major leaguers
Ted Abernathy	
Greg Booker	
John Brebbia
Tom Brewer	
Cap Clark
Bill Evans
Bill Graham
Greg Harris	
Bunny Hearn
 George Kirby
Ed Sauer
Dick Such	
Joe Winkelsas

See also
List of NCAA Division I baseball programs

References

 Calvert, S. (2009). "60 years and still going strong", Pendulum.
(2009). "Elon Baseball", Elon University Athletics.
(2009).  "Elon University Team History", The Baseball Cube.

 
1900 establishments in North Carolina
Baseball teams established in 1900